Matey Kaziyski (born 23 September 1984) is a Bulgarian volleyball player, member of Bulgaria men's national volleyball team during 2003–2012 and Italian club Trentino Volley, a participant of the Olympic Games Beijing 2008, bronze medalist of the World Championship 2006, World Cup 2007 and European Championship 2009. He is a multiple winner of the CEV Champions League and FIVB Volleyball Men's Club World Championship with the Italian club Trentino Volley.

Personal life
Kaziyski was born in Sofia, Bulgaria. His parents were volleyball players in Bulgarian national teams. As a child he trained different sports like football, basketball and  horse riding. Kaziyski is dating Elisabetta Farrugio, former Miss Trento. In 2017 their son Aleksander was born.

Career

Clubs
Kaziyski and Radostin Stoychev have been working together since 2004 in the clubs of Slavia Sofia, Dynamo Moscow, Halkbank Ankara and Trentino.  Between 2008 and 2015, the Bulgarian won fifteen titles with Trentino, including four Italian Championship titles, three CEV Champions League titles and four Club World Championship titles. In 2015 he left Trentino Volley to play in the  Japanese top championship.  In the 2016 season, he returned to Trentino.

National team
Kaziyski with Bulgaria team won  the bronze medal in the  2006 World Championship, ranking fifth among the most productive scorers in the championship and receiving the best server award. In 2012 Kaziyski left the Bulgaria men's national volleyball team, together with coach Radostin Stoytchev, due to a scandal with Bulgarian Volleyball Federation (BFV). The player said he would not get back, until the leadership and structure of the BFV is changed.

Sporting achievements

Clubs
 CEV Champions League
  2008/2009 – with Itas Diatec Trentino
  2009/2010 – with Itas Diatec Trentino
  2010/2011 – with Itas Diatec Trentino

 FIVB Club World Championship
  Doha 2009 – with Itas Diatec Trentino
  Doha 2010 – with Itas Diatec Trentino
  Doha 2011 – with Itas Diatec Trentino
  Doha 2012 – with Itas Diatec Trentino
  Betim 2021 – with Itas Trentino
  Betim 2022 – with Trentino Itas

 National championships
 2004/2005  Bulgarian Cup, with Slavia Sofia
 2005/2006  Russian Cup, with Dynamo Moscow
 2005/2006  Russian Championship, with Dynamo Moscow
 2007/2008  Italian Championship, with Itas Diates Trentino
 2009/2010  Italian Cup, with Itas Diates Trentino
 2010/2011  Italian Championship, with Itas Diates Trentino
 2011/2012  Italian SuperCup, with Itas Diates Trentino
 2011/2012  Italian Cup, with Itas Diates Trentino
 2012/2013  Italian Championship, with Itas Diates Trentino
 2012/2013  Italian Cup, with Itas Diates Trentino
 2012/2013  Emir Cup, with Al Rayyan
 2013/2014  Turkish SuperCup, with Halkbank Ankara
 2013/2014  Turkish Cup, with Halkbank Ankara
 2013/2014  Turkish Championship, with Halkbank Ankara
 2014/2015  Italian Championship, with Trentino Volley
 2021/2022  Italian SuperCup, with Itas Trentino
 2022/2023  Italian Cup, with Itas Trentino

Individual awards
 2004 FIVB World League – Best Server
 2006 FIVB World League – Best Spiker
 2006 FIVB World Championship – Best Server
 2007 CEV Champions League – Best Server
 2008 Italian Championship Final – Most Valuable Player
 2009 CEV Champions League – Most Valuable Player
 2009 FIVB Club World Championship – Best Spiker
 2009 FIVB Club World Championship – Most Valuable Player
 2010 Interior Ministry – Man of Year Bulgaria
 2011 CEV Champions League – Best Spiker
 2011 FIVB Club World Championship – Best Server
 2014 CEV Champions League – Best Receiver
 2014 FIVB Club World Championship – Best Outside Spiker
 2022 FIVB Club World Championship – Best Opposite

Record
 132 km/h spike speed

References

External links

 

1984 births
Living people
Sportspeople from Sofia
Bulgarian men's volleyball players
Volleyball players at the 2008 Summer Olympics
Olympic volleyball players of Bulgaria
Bulgarian expatriates in Italy
Expatriate volleyball players in Italy
Bulgarian expatriate sportspeople in Turkey
Expatriate volleyball players in Turkey
Bulgarian expatriates in Russia
Expatriate volleyball players in Russia
Bulgarian expatriate sportspeople in Japan
Expatriate volleyball players in Japan
Outside hitters